4436 is the debut Extended play (EP) by South African rapper and TV personality Boity Thulo, mononymously known as Boity. It was released on 4 December 2020 under Universal Music South Africa. The title signifies the street number of where she grew up in Potchefstroom.

Awards and nominations

References 

2020 debut albums
2020 debut EPs
Universal Music Group albums
Universal Music Group EPs